John Grace (born 1957) is an Irish former hurler.  At club level he played with Silvermines and was also a member of the Tipperary senior hurling team. He usually lined out at midfield.

Career

Grace first came to prominence at juvenile and underage levels with the Silvermines club in Dolla. He was just 17-years-old when he lined out with the club's senior team that won the North Tipperary Championship title in 1974. Grace's performances for the club brought him to the attention of the Tipperary minor team selectors. After two years in that grade he preogressed onto the under-21 team and won a Munster Under-21 Championship title in 1978. Grace lined out with the Tipperary senior hurling team at various times between 1979 and 1984.

Honours

Silvermines
North Tipperary Senior Hurling Championship: 1974

Tipperary
National Hurling League: 1978-79
Munster Under-21 Hurling Championship: 1978

References

External links
 John Grace profile on Tipp GAA Archives website

1957 births
Living people
Silvermines hurlers
Tipperary inter-county hurlers